The president of Croatia, officially the President of the Republic of Croatia, is the head of state, commander-in-chief of the military and chief representative of the Republic of Croatia both within the country and abroad. The president is the holder of the highest office in Croatia. However, the president is not the head of the executive branch ("non executive president") as Croatia has a parliamentary system in which the holder of the post of prime minister is the most powerful person within the country's constitutional framework and everyday politics.

The president maintains the regular and coordinated operation and stability of the national government system, and safeguards the independence and territorial integrity of the country. The president has the power to call ordinary and extraordinary elections for the Croatian Parliament (in a manner specified by the Constitution), as well as to call referendums (with countersignature of the prime minister). The president formally appoints the prime minister on the basis of the balance of power in parliament and consultations conducted with the leaders of parliamentary parties, grants pardons and awards decorations and other state awards. The president and Government (Cabinet) cooperate in conducting foreign policy. In addition, the president is the commander-in-chief of the Croatian Armed Forces. The president appoints the director of the Security and Intelligence Agency in agreement with the prime minister. The president may dissolve the Parliament under circumstances provided by the Constitution. Although enjoying immunity, the president is impeachable for violation of the Constitution. In case of a temporary or permanent incapability by the president to discharge the duties of his or her office, the speaker of the Parliament assumes the office of acting president until the president resumes his or her duties, or until the election of a new president within 60 days of the permanent vacancy occurring.

The Office of the President of the Republic consists of the immediate staff of the president of Croatia, as well as support staff reporting to the president. The office is located in the Presidential Palace in the Pantovčak area of Zagreb. The Constitution of Croatia defines the appearance and use of the presidential standard, which is flown on the buildings of the Office of the President, the residence of the president, any vehicles in use by the president, and in other ceremonial occasions.

The president is elected on the basis of universal suffrage, through a secret ballot, for a five-year term. If no candidate in the elections secures more than 50% of all votes cast (including blank and spoilt ballots), a runoff election is held. The Constitution of Croatia sets a limit of a maximum of two terms in office. The president-elect is required to take an oath of office before the judges of the Constitutional Court. Franjo Tuđman won the first Croatian presidential elections in 1992 and in 1997. During his time in office, the constitution adopted in 1990 provided for a semi-presidential system, which was in the coming years further strengthened by laws specifically aimed at providing Tuđman with sweeping powers (e.g. naming and dismissing numerous government officials, confirming county prefects), as his HDZ party held a supermajority in parliament throughout the 1990s. After his death in 1999, the constitution was amended and many presidential powers were transferred to parliament, to the prime minister and to his government. Stjepan Mesić won two consecutive terms, in 2000 and in 2005, and served as president until 2010. Ivo Josipović won the presidential election held from 2009 to 2010 and left office in 2015, after losing his reelection bid for a second term. Kolinda Grabar-Kitarović won the election held in December 2014 and January 2015, but was defeated in her bid for a second term. Namely, on 5 January 2020 the centre-left former prime minister, Zoran Milanović, won the 2019–20 election in the second round and took office on 19 February 2020.

List of office-holders

This is a graphical timeline listing of the presidents of Croatia since the first multi-party elections in 1990.

Powers, duties and responsibilities

The president of Croatia, officially styled President of the Republic represents the Republic of Croatia in the country and abroad as the head of state, maintains the regular and coordinated operation and stability of the national government system and safeguards the independence and territorial integrity of the country. The president is barred from executing any other public or professional duty while in office.

The president of Croatia calls elections for the Croatian Parliament and convenes the first meeting of the parliamentary assembly. The president is also required to appoint a prime minister, on the basis of the balance of power in the parliament. The appointed candidate is in turn required to seek confirmation from the parliament through a confidence vote, in order to receive a mandate to lead the Croatian Government (after given confidence by the absolute majority of the MPs, the president formally appoints the candidate as Prime Minister, while PM appoints ministers; all with the countersignature of the speaker of the Croatian Parliament). The president may also call referendums, grant pardons and award decorations and other forms of recognition defined by legislation.

Foreign affairs

The president of Croatia and the Government cooperate in the formulation and implementation of Croatia's foreign policy. This provision of the constitution is an occasional source of conflict between the president and the government. The president decides on the establishment of diplomatic missions and consular offices of the Republic of Croatia abroad, at the Government's proposal and with the countersignature of the prime minister. The president, following prior countersignature of the prime minister, appoints and recalls diplomatic representatives of the Republic of Croatia, at the proposal of the Government and upon receiving the opinion of an applicable committee of the parliament. The president receives letters of credence and letters of recall from foreign diplomatic representatives.

National security and defense

The president of Croatia is the commander-in-chief of the armed forces of the Republic of Croatia and appoints and relieves military commanders of duty, esp. the chief of general staff, conforming to applicable legislation. The President confers ranks on (and promotes) commissioned officers and generals/admirals, upon minister's proposal.

The president cooperates with the government directing operation of the Croatian security and intelligence system. The president and the prime minister jointly appoint heads of the security agencies, and the president may attend cabinet meetings, taking part in discussions held at such meetings. The president and the prime minister jointly convene Defense Council as well as the National Security Council; the president chairs these councils and their meetings.

The president of Croatia is supported in his defense and national security duties and responsibilities by the Military Cabinet (Vojni ured) as a part of the Office of the President, staffed by commissioned officers. The President works closely with the Chief of the General Staff of the Armed Forces.

War and State of Emergency
Pursuant to decisions of the parliament, the president declares war and concludes peace. In cases of immediate threats to the independence, unity and existence of the state, the president may order the use of armed forces, even if no state of war is declared, provided that such an order is countersigned by the prime minister. During a state of war, the president may promulgate regulations with the force of law on the basis of, and within the scope of, authority obtained from the parliament. In such circumstances, the president may convene government cabinet meetings and preside over them. If the parliament is not in session, the president is authorized to regulate all matters required by the state of war through regulations carrying the force of law. In case of an immediate threat to the independence, unity and existence of the state, or if the governmental bodies are prevented from performing their constitutional duties regularly, the president may, at the proposal of the prime minister, issue regulations carrying the force of law. Such regulations must also be countersigned by the prime minister to become valid. The president is required to submit regulations that are promulgated thus to the parliament for approval as soon as the parliament may convene, otherwise the regulations become void.

Dissolution of Parliament

The president of Croatia may dissolve Parliament upon the request of the government if the government proposes a confidence motion to Parliament and the majority of all deputies adopt a motion of no confidence or if Parliament fails to approve government budget 120 days after the budget is proposed in the parliament. That decision must be countersigned by the prime minister to become valid. The president may also dissolve Parliament after a motion of no confidence supported by a majority of all deputies has been adopted and a new government cannot be formed within 30 days or if a new government cannot be formed after general elections (maximum period of 120 days). However, the president may not dissolve Parliament at the request of the government if a procedure to determine if the president has violated provisions of the constitution is in progress.

Office of the President

The Office of the President of the Republic consists of the immediate staff of the president of Croatia, as well as support staff reporting to the president. As of May 2008, the office employed 170 staff, with the maximum staffing level set at 191 by the Regulation on Internal Organisation of the Office of the President of Croatia. In 2009 government budget, the office was allocated 54 million kuna ( 7.3 million euro). The net monthly salary of the president is 23,500 kuna ( 3,170 euro).

The Office of the President was created by a presidential decree by Franjo Tuđman on 19 January 1991. The office is headed by a chief of staff, who is appointed by the president. The presidents declare bylaws regulating composition of the office. The office employs advisors to the president and comprises eight departments, four councils, presidential pardon commission and two decorations and awards commissions.

Presidential Palace

The Presidential Palace (also referred to by the metonym Pantovčak) in Zagreb is the official workplace of the president. The president does not actually live in the building, as it is used as the Office of the President of Croatia rather than as a residence. It had been used as the official residence since then-president Franjo Tuđman moved there following the October 1991 bombing of Banski dvori. In addition to the original building, there is also an  annex built in 1993, an ancillary structure housing office security services and a bomb shelter predating the 1990s. The building, formerly known as Villa Zagorje or Tito's Villa, was designed by architects Vjenceslav Richter and Kazimir Ostrogović and completed in 1964 for the former Yugoslav president Josip Broz Tito.

Election and taking office

The president is elected on the basis of universal suffrage, through a secret ballot, for a five-year term. If no candidate in the elections secures more than 50% of the votes, a runoff election is held in 14 days. The Constitution of Croatia sets a limit to a maximum of two terms in office and requires election dates to be determined within 30 to 60 days before the expiry of the term of the incumbent president. Any citizen of Croatia of 18 or over may be a candidate in a presidential election, provided that the candidate is endorsed by 10,000 voters. The endorsements are required in form of a list containing name, address, personal identification number and voter signature. The presidential elections are regulated by an act of the parliament.

The constitution requires that the president-elect resign from political party membership. The president-elect is also required to resign from the parliament as well. Before assuming presidential duty, the president-elect is required to take an oath of office before the judges of the Constitutional Court, swearing loyalty to the Constitution of Croatia. The inauguration ceremony is traditionally held at St. Mark's Square in Zagreb, in front of the St. Mark's Church, midway between the building of the Parliament of Croatia and Banski dvori—the seat of the Government of Croatia. The text of the oath is defined by the Presidential Elections Act amendments of 1997. The text in its Croatian form is not sensitive to gender and all nouns (e.g. Predsjednik (President), državni poglavar (head of state)) always retain their masculine form, even when the president being sworn in is a woman (as was the case with Kolinda Grabar-Kitarović in 2015). There is however a notation within the Constitution of Croatia which states that all nouns used within the text of the document apply equally to both genders. The text of the presidential oath of office is as follows:

Presidential elections

Presidential elections were held in Croatia for the first time on 2 August 1992, simultaneously with the 1992 parliamentary elections. Voter turnout was 74.9%. The result was a victory for Franjo Tuđman of the Croatian Democratic Union (HDZ), who received 57.8% of the vote in the first round of the elections, ahead of 7 other candidates. Dražen Budiša, the Croatian Social Liberal Party (HSLS) candidate and runner-up in the election, received 22.3% of the vote. The second presidential elections in modern Croatia were held on 15 June 1997. The incumbent, Franjo Tuđman ran opposed by Zdravko Tomac, the candidate of the Social Democratic Party of Croatia (SDP), and Vlado Gotovac, nominated by the HSLS. Tomac and Gotovac received 21.0% and 17.6% of votes respectively in the first round of voting, and Tuđman secured another term. The third presidential elections were held on 24 January 2000, to fill the office of the President of the Republic, after the incumbent Franjo Tuđman died on 10 December 1999. The first round of voting saw Stjepan Mesić, candidate of the Croatian People's Party (HNS) in the lead, receiving 41.3% of votes, followed by Dražen Budiša of the HSLS with 27.8% of votes and Mate Granić, nominated by the HDZ, receiving 22.6% of votes. The runoff election, the first in the presidential elections of modern Croatia, was held on 7 February, when Mesić won, picking up 56.9% of votes. Voter turnout in the first round was 63.0% and 60.9% in the runoff. The first round of the fourth presidential elections was held on 2 January 2005. No candidate secured a first-round victory; however, the incumbent Mesić enjoyed a substantial lead over other candidates, as he received 48.9% of votes, and the second and third ranked candidates Jadranka Kosor (HDZ) and Boris Mikšić (independent) managed only 20.3% and 17.8% of voter support respectively. Ultimately, Mesić won reelection, receiving 65.9% of votes in the runoff held on 16 January. The 2009–2010 presidential election was held on 27 December 2009, with Ivo Josipović (SDP) picking up 32.4% of votes, followed by Milan Bandić (independent), Andrija Hebrang (HDZ) and Nadan Vidošević (independent) receiving 14.8%, 12.0% and 11.3% of the votes respectively. The second round of voting was held on 10 January 2010, when Josipović defeated Bandić, receiving 60.3% of the vote. The first round of the most recent presidential election was held on 28 December 2014, where Josipović won 38.46% of the votes, followed by Kolinda Grabar-Kitarović (HDZ) who received 37.22% of ballots. The third was an independent candidate, Ivan Vilibor Sinčić who received 16.42% of votes, and Milan Kujundžić (Croatian Dawn – Party of the People) who was supported by 6.3% of the votes. The runoff was held on 11 January 2015, and Grabar-Kitarović won by a margin of approximately one percentage point.

History

The Socialist Republic of Croatia within SFR Yugoslavia was led by a group of communist party officials, who formed a collective Presidency with the president of the Presidency at its head. The first democratic elections of 1990 did not elect members of the Presidency directly. Rather, the parliament was tasked with filling these positions as it had done in the socialist period. The HDZ won the elections and its leader Tuđman assumed the presidency on 30 May 1990. On 25 July of the same year, the parliament passed several constitutional amendments, including amendment LXXI, which created the position of President and Vice-Presidents. The Christmas Constitution, passed on 22 December 1990, established the government as a semi-presidential system and called for presidential elections.

Tuđman won the presidential elections in 1992, and was inaugurated on 12 August 1992. He was reelected in 1997, and the Constitution of Croatia was amended the same year. After his death in 1999, the constitution was amended and much of the presidential powers were transferred to the parliament and the government, creating a parliamentary system. Mesić won two consecutive terms in 2000 on the HNS ticket and in 2005, the maximum term permitted by the constitution. Josipović, an SDP candidate, won the presidential elections held in 2009–2010. Grabar-Kitarović won the elections of 2014–15 and she was voted to become the first woman president of Croatia.

Immunity and impeachment
The President of Croatia enjoys immunity—the president may not be arrested, nor can any criminal proceedings be instituted against the president without prior consent from the Constitutional Court. The only case in which immunity does not apply is if the president has been caught in the act of committing a criminal offense, which carries a penalty of imprisonment for more than five years. In such a case the state body that has detained the president must notify the President of the Constitutional Court immediately.

The President of Croatia is impeachable for any violation of the Constitution committed in performance of duty. Impeachment proceedings may be initiated by the Parliament of Croatia by a two-thirds majority vote of all members of the parliament. The impeachment of the president is then decided by the Constitutional Court, by a two-thirds majority vote of all its judges. If the Constitutional Court impeaches the president, the president's term is terminated.

Vacancy or incapacity

In the case of brief incapacitation to execute the office of the President of Croatia due to absence, illness or vacations, the president may transfer his powers to the Speaker of the Croatian Parliament to act as a deputy. The president decides on the revocation of this authority and his return to the office. If the president is prevented from performing his duties for a longer period of time due to illness or other form of incapacitation, and especially if the president is unable to decide on a transfer of powers to a deputy, the Speaker of the parliament becomes the acting president, assuming presidential duty pursuant to a decision of the Constitutional Court, made upon request of the Government.

In the case of death in office or resignation, submitted to the President of the Constitutional Court and communicated to the Speaker of the parliament, or in cases when the Constitutional Court decides to terminate the presidential term through impeachment, the Speaker of the parliament becomes acting president. In those circumstances, new legislation is countersigned by the prime minister instead of the president and a new presidential election must be held within 60 days. This situation occurred after the death of Franjo Tuđman (the only president to date to die in office) on 10 December 1999, when Vlatko Pavletić became the acting president. After the parliamentary elections of 2000, the role was transferred to Zlatko Tomčić, who filled the office until Stjepan Mesić was elected President of Croatia in 2000.

Symbols

Legislation defines the appearance and use of the Presidential Standard of Croatia as a symbol of the President of Croatia, and the appearance and use of the presidential sash as a symbol of honour of the office of the president. The presidential standard is a square, blue field with a thin border of alternating red and white squares on each side. In the centre of the blue field is the main shield of the coat of arms of Croatia with the historical arms of Croatia surrounding the main shield. From left to right, these are the oldest known coats of arms of Croatia, the Republic of Dubrovnik, Dalmatia, Istria and Slavonia, adorned with bands of gold, red and white stripes extending down vertically. Atop the shield there is a Croatian tricolour ribbon with golden letters RH that stand for the Republic of Croatia, executed in Roman square capitals. The presidential standard is flown on buildings of the Office of the President of Croatia, the residence of the president, transportation vehicles when in use by the president, and in other ceremonial occasions. The presidential standard was designed by Miroslav Šutej in 1990.

The presidential sash is a Croatian tricolour band, trimmed with gold and adorned with the coat of arms of Croatia, which is placed in a white field, with the tricolour at the front. The arms are bordered by oak branches on the left and olive branches on the right. The sash is worn diagonally, over the right shoulder, and is fastened using a square clasp trimmed with golden Croatian interlace. The sash is adorned with the arms used on the presidential standard, although without the ribbon used in the arms. The constitution specifies that the sash is worn on Statehood Day, during awards ceremonies, during the acceptance of letters of credence and in other ceremonial occasions. The presidential sash was not in use since 2000 inauguration of Stjepan Mesić.

Post-presidency
Former presidents of the Republic of Croatia are provided with an office and two staff members paid by the state once they leave the office. In addition, former presidents are assigned a driver, an official car and bodyguards. The government of Croatia is required to provide these benefits within 30 days following the end of the term of president, upon a president's personal request. Stjepan Mesić's office is located in Grškovićeva Street in Zagreb. The office employs a public-relations advisor and a foreign policy advisor. The office was established in 2010 and assigned an annual budget of 1.3 million kuna ( 175,000 euro). According to Mesić himself, his new office of the former president shall be at the disposal of Croatian companies to help them expand their market. Since the office has been established, former president Mesić also receives foreign diplomats and visits abroad where he meets officials and delivers lectures on occasion.

The rights of the former presidents are defined by a parliamentary Act enacted in 2004, during the first term of Stjepan Mesić. Before that act was enacted, the constitution provided that the former presidents shall become members of the Chambers of Counties of the Parliament of Croatia for life, unless otherwise requested by the president. This was never exercised in practice, since Franjo Tuđman died in office and the Chamber of Counties was abolished before the end of the first term of Stjepan Mesić.

See also

List of presidents of Croatia
Prime Minister of Croatia
List of cabinets of Croatia
Speaker of the Croatian Parliament
Politics of the Socialist Republic of Croatia#Executive
Secretary of the League of Communists of Croatia
List of heads of state of Yugoslavia
Prime Minister of Yugoslavia

References

External links
Office of the President of Croatia
President of the Republic of Croatia 2000–2010

 
Politics of Croatia
Government of Croatia
Modern history of Croatia
1990 establishments in Croatia